Éric Srecki (born 2 July 1964 in Béthune, Pas-de-Calais) is a French fencer and Olympic and World champion in the épée competition.

He won a gold medal in individual épée event at the 1992 Summer Olympics in Barcelona. He won a team gold medal in 1988, silver in 2000, and a bronze medal in 1996. He won the individual Epee World Fencing Championships in 1995 and 1997.

References

External links 
 
 
 
 

1964 births
Living people
People from Béthune
French male épée fencers
Olympic fencers of France
Fencers at the 1988 Summer Olympics
Fencers at the 1992 Summer Olympics
Fencers at the 1996 Summer Olympics
Fencers at the 2000 Summer Olympics
Olympic gold medalists for France
Olympic silver medalists for France
Olympic bronze medalists for France
Olympic medalists in fencing
Medalists at the 1988 Summer Olympics
Medalists at the 1992 Summer Olympics
Medalists at the 1996 Summer Olympics
Medalists at the 2000 Summer Olympics
Sportspeople from Pas-de-Calais